Chengbei Subdistrict is a subdistrict of Xingren, Guizhou, People's Republic of China. , it has four residential communities (社区 or 居委会) and three villages under its administration.

References

Subdistricts of Guizhou
Xingren